Mount Gordon is a cinder cone in the Wrangell Mountains of eastern Alaska, United States, located between Nabesna Glacier and the stratovolcano Mount Drum. The exact age of Mount Gordon remains unknown.

References

Mountains of Alaska
Landforms of Copper River Census Area, Alaska
Volcanoes of Alaska
Cinder cones of the United States
Mountains of Unorganized Borough, Alaska
Volcanoes of Unorganized Borough, Alaska
Pleistocene volcanoes